Dalton High School may refer to:
 Dalton High School (Georgia)
 Dalton High School (Nebraska), a defunct high school in Dalton, Nebraska
 Dalton High School (Ohio)
 Dalton School, a private school in New York City
 Leyton High School, a high school in Dalton, Nebraska
 Wahconah Regional High School, a high school in Dalton, Massachusetts